Pierre Bonnet may refer to:

  (fl. 1585), French composer
 Pierre Ossian Bonnet (1819–1892), French mathematician
 Pierre Bonnet (naturalist) (1897–1990), French arachnologist
 Pierre Bonnet (boxer) (1910–1983), French boxer